Stendek was a Spanish language magazine dedicated to UFOs and the paranormal, published by Centro de Estudios Interplanetarios (CEI) between 1970 and 1981 in Barcelona. The editor was Joan Crexells.

See also
 List of magazines in Spain

References

External links
 Inspired by Stendek: a Spanish UFO magazine

1970 establishments in Spain
1981 disestablishments in Spain
Defunct magazines published in Spain
Magazines established in 1970
Magazines disestablished in 1981
Magazines published in Barcelona
Paranormal magazines
Spanish-language magazines